Winston Patrick Kuo is a Chinese-American computational biologist who specializes in utilizing translational technologies to solve biomedical related issues. He is currently Assistant Professor in the Developmental Biology at Harvard School of Dental Medicine and Director of the Laboratory for Innovative Translational Technologies.

Biography
Winston Kuo completed his education at Columbia University earning his dental degree, as well as a DMSc from Harvard Medical School and a MS from MIT. He went on to complete a two-year dental General Practice Residency program at Catholic Medical Center in Brooklyn, New York.

Research
He was the first to compare DNA microarray platforms on a large scale. He further developed a framework for comparing DNA microarrays at a graduate student in Connie Cepko's lab in the Department of Genetics, Harvard Medical School, which addressed issues related to the reliability of DNA microarrays.

References

External links
 New Facility IDs Innovative Translational Technology, 2008 April
Weighing our measures of gene expression, 2006 November
Microarray Mix and Match, 2006 August
Microarrays Measure up Well, 2006 August
Top Spots at the Exon Level, 2006, August

Living people
21st-century American biologists
American people of Chinese descent
Columbia University College of Dental Medicine alumni
Harvard Medical School faculty
Year of birth missing (living people)
Massachusetts Institute of Technology alumni
Harvard Medical School alumni